Izmaylovo or Izmailovo may refer to:
Izmaylovo District, a district of Eastern Administrative Okrug, Moscow, Russia
Izmaylovo (Moscow Central Circle), a station on the Moscow Central Circle, Russia
Izmailovo Hotel, largest hotel complex in Moscow, Russia
Izmaylovo, Ulyanovsk Oblast, an urban-type settlement in Ulyanovsk Oblast, Russia
Izmaylovo, Moscow Oblast, a settlement in Moscow Oblast, Russia
Izmaylovo Estate of Alexis I of Russia

See also
Izmaylov
Izmaylovsky (disambiguation)